Mbala Mbuta Biscotte (born 7 April 1985 in Kinshasa) is a Congolese footballer who last plays as striker for FC Locarno.

Career 
Mbala has previously played for Hapoel Tel Aviv F.C. and Grasshopper Club Zürich, he also played for the congolese club DC Motema Pembe, because of him they won the cup of Congo. And bolasie chose to play for them

International career
Biscotte is a popular player on the DR Congo national football team. He appeared in the 2004 African Nations Cup where the Congo failed to advance to the second round. He has made regularly appearances for the national squad since late 2004. In 2004/2005 he helped the Congo qualify for the 2006 African Nations Cup. Biscotte played in every match in the 2006 African Nations Cup where the Congo made it to the quarter-finals.

Perhaps his most famous moment was against South Africa in 2004 for 2006 World Cup/African Nations Cup qualifying. In the 87th minute he made a mazy run around numerous defenders deep in South Africa's end that set up Kabamba Musasa for a tap in goal that gave the DR Congo a 1–0 victory. Because of that victory the fan named him Pied de Jesus (Jesus' foot) and also named him sauvons le Congo meaning Saves Congo due to the fact that his intervention revived DR Congo's qualification chances.

Biscotte also featured prominently in the BBC documentary Frontline Football, part one of which followed the Congolese national team as they prepared for the match against South Africa. The goal he set up for Kabamba Musasa features as a perfect climax to the documentary.

International goals
Scores and results list DR Congo's goal tally first.

Personal life 
Biscotte's brother Glynn has represented DR Congo's Under 21s, and is currently playing in England for Brigg Town.

See also
List of people related to the Democratic Republic of the Congo

References

1985 births
Living people
Footballers from Kinshasa
Democratic Republic of the Congo footballers
Democratic Republic of the Congo expatriate footballers
Democratic Republic of the Congo international footballers
TP Mazembe players
Daring Club Motema Pembe players
Grasshopper Club Zürich players
Hapoel Tel Aviv F.C. players
Yverdon-Sport FC players
Ittihad FC players
FC Locarno players
FC Winterthur players
FC Schaffhausen players
Swiss Super League players
Swiss Challenge League players
Expatriate footballers in Israel
Expatriate footballers in Saudi Arabia
Expatriate footballers in Switzerland
Association football forwards
Democratic Republic of the Congo expatriate sportspeople in Switzerland
Democratic Republic of the Congo expatriate sportspeople in Israel
Democratic Republic of the Congo expatriate sportspeople in Saudi Arabia
2004 African Cup of Nations players
2006 Africa Cup of Nations players
Saudi Professional League players
21st-century Democratic Republic of the Congo people